Ciputra Artpreneur at Kuningan Jakarta offers a 1,157-seat International Standard Theater, Multi-Function Hall accommodating up to 2,000 guests, and Dr. (HC) Ir. Ciputra’s private museum  displaying 32 paintings & 18 sketches of Hendra Gunawan. Ciputra Artpreneur is a perfect venue for hosting exhibitions, conferences, concerts, weddings, product launches, awarding night, business dinners, fashion show, and theatrical performances.

It is a place for inspiration, creativity, and innovation and to discover and experience Indonesian and international art. Ciputra Artpreneur also hosts a variety of programs from Broadway musicals, local theater productions, art exhibitions, and weddings.

Gallery 
The Ciputra Artpreneur Gallery is a multi-function hall accommodating up to 2,000 guests that can host a variety of events and activities that contribute to the center’s financial sustainability. Being a white-box space, the Ciputra Artpreneur Gallery are able to handle a wide variety of events from UOB Painting of the Year, Sebastian Gunawan’s annual fashion show, Google Android One Event, BMW and Mercedes-Benz car shows, New Cities Summit, even weddings.

Theater 
The international standard Ciputra Artpreneur Theater is the jewel in the crown of Ciputra Artpreneur. The theater has hosted a wide variety of international performances from Beauty and The Beast, Annie, Shrek, The Red Lantern, Toyota Classic Concert and local theater productions such as Opera Carmen by The Resonanz Children's Choir, Lasem by D’Art Beat, Di Atas Rata-Rata by Erwin Gutawa and Gita Gutawa, Janji Toba by Banyu Wening, and Senandung Keroncong Indonesia by Sundari Soekotjo. The theater has state-of-the-art lighting, sound, and acoustics and is incomparable in terms of theater facilities in Indonesia.

Museum 
Witness The Largest Collection of Hendra Gunawan artworks in Indonesia. Ciputra Artpreneur Museum displaying 32 paintings & 18 sketches of Hendra Gunawan, a private collection of Dr. (HC) Ir. Ciputra. We welcome you to visit our museum and be inspired by Indonesian art and artists. Opening hours: Tuesday - Sunday, 12 PM - 6 PM.

Awards 
 A Golden Medal for the FIABCI Prix D'Excellence Award 2016
 2 Museum Rekor Indonesia (MURI) Awards, such as: Exhibition Gallery with the Largest Projection Screen, and Performance Theater at the Highest Floor
 Golden Achievement Award in Purposed Built Category from REI Property 2016
 The Innovative Property Public Facility from Property Indonesia Award 2017

Location 
Ciputra World 1 Jakarta,
Retail Podium Lv. 11-13 Jl. Prof. Dr. Satrio Kav. 3-5, Karet Kuningan, Jakarta 12940.
P. +62 21 2988 9889 | F. +62 21 2988 9989.
Official website: www.ciputraartpreneur.com

Ciputra Artpreneur can be accessed through parking P8-P10 Lotte Shopping Avenue, drop-off lobby P11, if from Mall Lotte Shopping Avenue use Lift Satrio and Lift Avenue towards P11 or use the escalator from the 4th floor.

See also
Ciputra World Jakarta
Museums in Jakarta

References

External links 

Arts organizations based in Indonesia